Momina  is a village in the administrative district of Gmina Waśniów, within Ostrowiec County, Świętokrzyskie Voivodeship, in south-central Poland.

The village has an approximate population of 160.

References

Momina